Grant Campbell may refer to:

 Grant Campbell (musician) (born 1979), British singer-songwriter
 Grant Campbell (politician) (1922–2008), Canadian Member of Parliament